River Oaks is a city in Tarrant County, Texas, United States. Its population was 7,427 at the 2010 census.

Geography

River Oaks is located at  (32.776696, –97.396052).

According to the United States Census Bureau, the city has a total area of 2.0 sq mi (5.2 km2), all of it land.

Demographics

2020 census

As of the 2020 United States census, there were 7,646 people, 2,630 households, and 1,882 families residing in the city.

2000 census
As of the census of 2000, 6,985 people, 2,713 households, and 1,888 families were residing in the city. The population density was 3,504.8 people per sq mi (1,355.2/km2). The 2,856 housing units averaged 1,433.0 per sq mi (554.1/km2). The racial makeup of the city was 84.84% White, 0.40% African American, 0.69% Native American, 0.77% Asian, 11.02% from other races, and 2.28% from two or more races. Hispanics or Latinos of any race were 27.23% of the population.

Of the 2,713 households, 33.2% had children under the age of 18 living with them, 51.3% were married couples living together, 13.3% had a female householder with no husband present, and 30.4% were not families. About 26.6% of all households were made up of individuals, and 13.3% had someone living alone who was 65 years of age or older. The average household size was 2.57, and the average family size was 3.11.

In the city, the age distribution was 27.0% under 18, 8.7% from 18 to 24, 29.4% from 25 to 44, 19.5% from 45 to 64, and 15.4% who were 65 or older. The median age was 36 years. For every 100 females, there were 93.4 males. For every 100 females age 18 and over, there were 88.9 males.

The median income for a household in the city was $31,229, and for a family was $36,396. Males had a median income of $31,086 versus $21,305 for females. The per capita income for the city was $16,610. About 9.8% of families and 11.7% of the population were below the poverty line, including 17.1% of those under age 18 and 10.9% of those age 65 or over.

Government and infrastructure
The United States Postal Service operates the Oaks Post Office at 1008 Roberts Cut Off Road.

Education
Schools in River Oaks are a part of the Castleberry Independent School District.

Schools that serve the city include:
 A.V. Cato Elementary School
 Castleberry Elementary School
 Irma Marsh Middle School
 Castleberry High School

References

External links
 City of River Oaks official website

Cities in Tarrant County, Texas
Cities in Texas
Dallas–Fort Worth metroplex